Hope is the twelfth album in the live praise and worship series of contemporary worship music by Hillsong Church. The album reached No. 3 on the ARIA Albums Chart.

Making of the album
Hope was recorded live at the new Hillsong Convention Centre over two nights in early 2003 by Darlene Zschech and the Hillsong team. The DVD for the album was directed by Luke Irvine.

Track listing 

Disc one
 "Better Than Life" (Marty Sampson) – 
 "Glory" (Reuben Morgan) – 
 "Ever Living God" (Raymond Badham) – 
 "Need You Here" (Morgan) – 
 "My Hope" (Darlene Zschech) – 
 "Still" (Morgan) – 
 "Angels" (Sampson) – 
 "Can't Stop Praising" (Tulele Faletolu & Sampson) – 
 "You Are"/"You Are Lord" ("You Are" Darlene Zschech; choir arrangement for "You Are Lord": Jennifer Va'a) – 
 "Here I Am to Worship/Call" ("Here I Am to Worship" Tim Hughes; "Call": Darlene Zschech) – 
 "Highest" (Morgan) – 

Disc two
 "Song of Freedom" (Marty Sampson) – 
 "Shout Your Fame" (Jonas Myrin, Natasha Bedingfield, Gio Galanti & Paul Nevison) – 
 "Exceeding Joy" (Miriam Webster) – 
 "King of Love" (Tanya Riches) – 
 "To the Ends of the Earth" (Joel Houston & Marty Sampson) – 
 "Free" (Sampson) – 
 "Highest" (reprise) – 

 DVD 
 "Song of Freedom"
 "Better Than Life"    
 "Ever Living God"
 "Exceeding Joy"
 "Need You Here"
 "My Hope"
 "Can't Stop Praising"
 "To The Ends Of The Earth"
 "Here I Am To Worship"/"Call"
 "Free"
 "King Of Love"
 "Still"
 "You Are"/"You Are Lord"
 "Angels"
 "Shout Your Fame"
 "Glory"    
 "Highest"

Personnel 

 Ruth Athanasio – choir conductor
 Raymond Badham – producer, acoustic guitar, music director
 Damian Bassett – vocals
 Julie Bassett – vocals
 Sonja Bailey – percussion
 Marcus Beaumont – electric guitar
 Steve Bullivant – saxophone
 Michael Guy Chislett – electric guitar
 Erica Crocker – vocals
 Ned Davies – vocals
 Holly Dawson – vocals
 Tulele Faletolu – vocals
 Ian Fisher – bass guitar
 Kylie Fisher – choir conductor
 Lucy Fisher – vocals
 Michelle Frager – vocals
 Craig Gower – piano, keyboards
 Peter Hart – vocals
 Scott Haslem – vocals, vocal production
 Nigel Hendroff – electric guitar, acoustic guitar
 Gary Honor – saxophone
 Matt Hope – trumpet, brass director
 Trent Hopkinson – trumpet
 Karen Horn – vocals
 Bobbie Houston (senior pastor) – executive producer
 Brian Houston (senior pastor) – executive producer
 Joel Houston – vocals, bass guitar
 Greg Hughes – trombone
 John Kasinathan – trombone
 Peter Kelly – percussion
 Peter King – piano, keyboards
 Stephanie Lambert – trumpet
 Garth Lazaro – vocals
 Jonno Louwrens – saxophone
 Steve Luke – trombone
 Donia Makedonez – vocals
 Steve McPherson – producer, vocals, vocal production
 Luke Munns – drums
 Reuben Morgan – producer, vocals, acoustic guitar
 Steve Ollis – choir conductor
 Katrina Peoples – vocals
 Woody Pierson – vocals
 Tanya Riches – choir conductor
 James Rudder – saxophone
 Natalie Rudder – choir conductor
 Marty Sampson – vocals, acoustic guitar
 Joanna Savage – vocals
 Reuben Singleton – flute
 Andrew Sloan – choir conductor
 Elisha Vella – percussion
 Miriam Webster – vocals
 Tim Whincop – trumpet
 Martine Williams – choir conductor
 Darlene Zschech – producer, worship leader, vocal production
 Hillsong Church Choir

References 

2003 live albums
2003 video albums
Live video albums
Hillsong Music live albums
Hillsong Music video albums
pt:Hope (Álbum Hillsong)